Hardanger Musikkfest or The Hardanger Music Festival is an annual music festival. In November 2021, media wrote that it is scheduled for later that month.

Previously it had been held every Pentecost since 1996. In June, Hardanger Musikkfest arranges about 40 concerts over five days in the Hardanger municipalities Ullensvang, Odda, Eidfjord and Jondal (5.-10. juni 2019).

The festival program mainly comprises Chamber music and Contemporary folke music from Hardanger and Norway in general. At the Hardanger conference in Ulvik it was announced byTora Augestad that 'Hiking' will be the theme of the festival in 2019.

The main base at the Hardanger Music Festival is in Lofthus in Ullensvang, the largest venues are Fjordahallen in Kinsarvik and Kraftkatedalen in Tyssedal.

Each year a number of renowned Norwegian and international musicians play at Hardanger Music Festival. These have included Oslo-Filharmonien, Bergen Filharmoniske Orkester, Kringkastingsorkestret, Lautten Compagney (Berlin) Forsvarets Musikkorps,
TrondheimSolistene, Barratt Dues Chamber Orchestra, Ensemble Allegria, Det Norske Kammerorkester, Vertavokvartetten, Cikada Strykekvartett, Den Danske strykekvartett, Engegårdkvartetten, Grieg Trio, Oslo Trio, Hot Club de Norvège, Mathias Eick Trio, Tord Gustavsen Trio, The Brazz Brothers, Trio Mediæval, Nordic Voices, Music for a While, Solveig Kringlebotn, Håkan Hagegård, 
Johannes Weisser, Ann-Helen Moen, Vilde Frang, Jan Garbarek, Knut Buen, Knut Hamre, Benedicte Maurseth, Åse Teigland, Unni Løvlid, Leif Ove Andsnes, Truls Mørk, Henning Kraggerud, Jean-Yves Thibaudet, Christian Ihle Hadland, Simon Trpčeski, Håvard Gimse, Sveinung Bjelland, Ole Edvard Antonsen, Tine Thing Helseth, Svein Tindberg, Helge Jordal, Åse Kleveland, Gunilla Süssmann and Wolfgang Plagge.

History 
The music festival was initiated by concertmaster Stig Nilsson of the Oslo Philharmonic Orchestra.

Artistic leaders 

 Stig Nilsson 1996-2012
 Anders Kjellberg Nilsson and Wolfgang Plagge 2012-2014.
 Therese Birkelund Ulvo and Tora Augestad 2015-present.

Managing directors 

 Per Erik Kise Larsen 1996-2001
 Alf Magnus Reistad 2001-2005
 Tone Tveito Eidnes 2005-2012
 Alf Magnus Reistad 2012-

References

External links 

Recurring events established in 1996
Music festivals in Norway
Pages with unreviewed translations